The Passion Song is a 1928 American silent drama film directed by Harry O. Hoyt and starring Gertrude Olmstead, Noah Beery and Wild Bill Elliott.

In England, two former South African prospectors become involved in a love triangle.

Cast
 Gertrude Olmstead as Elaine Van Ryn 
 Noah Beery as John Van Ryn 
 Wild Bill Elliott as Keith Brooke 
 Blue Washington as Ulambo

References

Bibliography
 Munden, Kenneth White. The American Film Institute Catalog of Motion Pictures Produced in the United States, Part 1. University of California Press, 1997.

External links

1928 films
1928 drama films
Silent American drama films
Films directed by Harry O. Hoyt
American silent feature films
1920s English-language films
American black-and-white films
Films set in England
1920s American films